Pematang Panggang–Kayuagung Toll Road   is a  toll road that connects Pematang Panggang to Kayuagung in the island of Sumatra, Indonesia. This toll road is part of a network of Trans-Sumatra Toll Road, and is a continuation of the Terbanggi Besar–Pematang Panggang Toll Road and it is connected to the Kayu Agung–Palembang–Betung Toll Road.

Exits

See also

References

Toll roads in Sumatra
Transport in Lampung